Washington Township is one of the eighteen townships of Monroe County, Ohio, United States. As of the 2010 census, the population was 511, including 76 people in the village of Graysville.

Geography
Located in the southwestern part of the county, it borders the following townships:
Wayne Township - north
Perry Township - northeast
Benton Township - east
Grandview Township, Washington County - southeast corner
Ludlow Township, Washington County - south
Bethel Township - west
Franklin Township - northwest

The village of Graysville is located in northern Washington Township, and the unincorporated community of Rinard Mills lies along the Little Muskingum River in the township's southwest.

Name and history
It is one of forty-three Washington Townships statewide.

Government
The township is governed by a three-member board of trustees, who are elected in November of odd-numbered years to a four-year term beginning on the following January 1. Two are elected in the year after the presidential election and one is elected in the year before it. There is also an elected township fiscal officer, who serves a four-year term beginning on April 1 of the year after the election, which is held in November of the year before the presidential election. Vacancies in the fiscal officership or on the board of trustees are filled by the remaining trustees.

References

External links
County website

Townships in Monroe County, Ohio
Townships in Ohio